State Route 33 (SR 33) is an  state highway that travels south-to-north through portions of Thomas, Brooks, Colquitt, Worth, and Crisp counties in the south-central part of the U.S. state of Georgia. The highway travels from its southern terminus, an intersection with US 84/SR 38 in Boston, to its northern terminus, an intersection with US 41/SR 7 north of Wenona. It also travels through Moultrie and Sylvester.

Route description

SR 33 begins at an intersection with US 84/SR 38 in Boston. The highway travels north-northeast to Pavo. After a brief concurrency in Pavo with SR 122, SR 33 travels to the north-northwest. In the southern part of Moultrie, SR 33 begins a concurrency with US 319 Bus. on Thomasville Road. The two highways travel north, through downtown Moultrie. North of the city, US 319 Bus. ends, and, after a brief concurrency with SR 133, SR 33 continues north to Sylvester. In Sylvester, SR 33 has a brief concurrency with SR 112 before departing and continuing north to meet its northern terminus, an intersection with US 41/SR 7 just north of Wenona, which is south of Cordele.

The only portion of SR 33 that is part of the National Highway System, a system of routes determined to be the most important for the nation's economy, mobility, and defense, is the entire length of the US 319 Bus. concurrency in Moultrie and the entire length of the SR 133 concurrency north of the city.

History

1920s
SR 33 was established at least as early as 1919, from Thomasville northeast and north-northwest to Sylvester. At this time, SR 35 was established from the Florida state line south-southeast of Quitman to SR 33 in Moultrie. By the end of September 1921, the northern terminus of SR 33 was proposed to be extended north-northeast to SR 7 south of Cordele. The northern terminus of SR 35 was truncated to SR 33 in Pavo. By October 1926, the segment of SR 33 from Thomasville to Moultrie was shifted eastward to SR 35's former path from the Florida state line to Quitman, and then from Quitman north-northwest and northwest to Moultrie. The segment of SR 35 from the Florida state line to Moultrie was shifted westward to SR 33's former path from Thomasville to Moultrie. The northern terminus of SR 33 was extended on its proposed path, from Sylvester to the Cordele area. US 41 was designated on SR 7 in the Cordele area. By October 1929, the northern terminus of SR 35 was extended north-northwest and north-northeast to Sylvester, replacing the Moultrie–Sylvester segment of SR 33, splitting SR 33 into two parts.

1930s to 1990s
By June 1930, the northern terminus of SR 35 was truncated to Moultrie, replaced by an extension of SR 33, which eliminated its split. In the first quarter of 1937, the entire length of SR 33 that existed at the time had a "completed hard surface". In the third quarter of 1939, SR 133 was extended on SR 35 south of Moultrie, south-southeast to SR 122 in Pavo, and south-southwest to US 84/SR 38 in Boston. In the second quarter of 1941, US 319 was designated on SR 35/SR 133 south of Moultrie and on all of SR 33 north of Moultrie. Between January 1945 and November 1946, US 319 was shifted eastward, off of SR 33, and onto SR 35. Between September 1953 and June 1954, the entire extension of SR 133, from Boston to Moultrie, was hard surfaced. In 1993, the path of SR 33 from Florida to Moultrie was shifted westward, replacing the Boston–Moultrie segment of SR 133. Its former segment was redesignated as SR 333, from the Florida state line to north of New Rock Hill, and an eastern rerouting of SR 133, from north of New Rock Hill to Moultrie.

Major intersections

Special route

Wenona connector route

State Route 33 Connector (SR 33 Conn.) is a  connector route near Cordele. SR 33 Conn. connects the SR 33 mainline, in Wenona, as well as US 41/SR 7, with Interstate 75 (I-75), via Rockhouse Road.

SR 33 Conn. begins at an intersection with the SR 33 mainline in Wenona. It continues to the east-northeast and crosses over some railroad tracks of Norfolk Southern Railway. It curves to the east, and then resumes its east-northeast direction. At an interchange with I-75, SR 33 Conn. ends, and Rockhouse Road continues to the east-northeast.

Between Augusta 1950 and January 1952, Rockhouse Road was established on this path. In 1978, SR 33 Conn. was established on its current path.

See also

References

External links

 

033
Transportation in Thomas County, Georgia
Transportation in Brooks County, Georgia
Transportation in Colquitt County, Georgia
Transportation in Worth County, Georgia
Transportation in Crisp County, Georgia